Stefano Salterio (1730 in Laglio – 1806) was an Italian sculptor.

Biography 
He worked mainly in Northern Italy and his works are on the Sacred Mountain of Domodossola, in the Church of San Lorenzo in Brescia, in St John's Collegiate in Morbegno, in the Church of San Giorgio in Laglio, in the Church of Santo Stefano in Dongo, in the church of San Giorgio martyr in Breda Cisoni di Sabbioneta. He was also the architect of the Neptune Fountain in Trento.

Notes 
 Churches
 St. Stephen Parish - Saint Stephen

Italian sculptors
1730 births
1806 deaths